Rudolph Martinus Britz (born 3 March 1989 in Virginia, South Africa) is a South African rugby union player who last played for the . His regular position is prop.

Career

Youth / CUT Ixias

In 2007, he represented them at the Under-18 Academy Week and also played for the  side in the 2007 Under-19 Provincial Championship. He also played for them in the 2008 Under-19 Provincial Championship and for the  side at the 2010 Under-21 Provincial Championship.

He represented university side  in the first two editions of the Varsity Shield competition. He scored a try for CUT in their match against  on their way to the final of the  2011 Varsity Shield, which they won by beating  25–18 to be crowned the first ever Varsity Shield champions.

He played in all nine matches for them during the 2012 Varsity Shield, scoring three tries en route to their second consecutive final.

Griffons

After his 2012 Varsity Shield season, he also became involved with the  senior side. He was included in their squad for the 2012 Currie Cup First Division season and made a total of fifteen appearances. He only started two of those matches, appearing as a replacement for Sarel Louw in the other matches, as the Griffons finished third on the log to qualify to the semi-finals of the competition. At the end of the season, he won the Junior of the Year and Most Improved Player at the Griffons' end-of-year awards.

He appeared in all seven of the ' matches in the 2013 Vodacom Cup and appeared eight times for the side in the 2013 Currie Cup First Division season, with the Griffons missing out on a semi-final spot in both competitions.

Five appearances followed in the 2014 Vodacom Cup.

References

South African rugby union players
Living people
1989 births
People from Matjhabeng Local Municipality
Rugby union props
Griffons (rugby union) players
Rugby union players from the Free State (province)